Binna is a monotypic genus of tiger moths in the family Erebidae. It includes one species, Binna pencillata, from West Africa and Kenya.

References
 , 2011: A review of some of the Binna-like species of Afrotropical Spilosoma Curtis (1825) listed by Goodger & Watson (1995) and including the genus Radiarctia Dubatolov (2006) (Lepidoptera: Arctiidae, Arctiinae). Zootaxa 2811: 22-36.
Natural History Museum Lepidoptera generic names catalog

Spilosomina
Moths described in 1865
Monotypic moth genera
Moths of Africa